Robert E. Bixby is an American mathematician, the Noah Harding Professor Emeritus of Computational and Applied Mathematics at Rice University. 

Bixby earned his Ph.D. in 1972 from Cornell University. His dissertation, Composition and Decomposition of Matroids and Related Topics, concerned matroid theory and was supervised by Louis Billera. His doctoral students have included Collette Coullard at Northwestern University, and Eva K. Lee at Rice.

He is the President and Co-founder of Gurobi Optimization. In 1987 he co-founded CPLEX Optimization, which was acquired by ILOG in 1997. 

Bixby was elected a member of the National Academy of Engineering in 1997 for contributions to combinatorial optimization and the development and commercialization of high-performance optimization software. He is also a fellow of the Institute for Operations Research and the Management Sciences.

References

External links
Mathematics, Rice University

Year of birth missing (living people)
Living people
Rice University faculty
20th-century American mathematicians
University of Kentucky faculty
Northwestern University faculty
Cornell University alumni
Members of the United States National Academy of Engineering
Fellows of the Institute for Operations Research and the Management Sciences
21st-century American mathematicians